Ngermid is a village in Koror, Palau, bordering Nikko Bay. The nearby Itungelbai river runs from its source in Ngermid through a short, narrow gorge to the sea.

Tourism 
Ngermid is popular for its scattered beautiful islands and beautiful seas and islets. There are a few hotels and resorts in the village.

Economy 
It mostly gets its economy from tourism and agriculture by the beautiful green islands overlooking the Pacific Ocean.

History 
It was formerly part of Koror, Palau then became independent a couple years later.

References 

Populated places in Palau